Ulysses S. Grant High School is a public high school located in the Valley Glen neighborhood of Los Angeles, California, United States, in the east central San Fernando Valley. It is located adjacent to Los Angeles Valley College.

It is part of District North 2 of the Los Angeles Unified School District. The school serves several areas, including Valley Glen, much of Sherman Oaks, and sections of both Van Nuys and North Hollywood.

Its mascot is the Lancer and the school colors are brown, orange, and white. The school motto is: "What we are to be we are now becoming."

The school newspaper is called The Odyssey in reference to President Grant's first name - Ulysses - the main character in Homer's epic The Odyssey.  There is a school tradition that, on or about April 1, a satirical issue is distributed called the "Oddity", which contains comical and irreverent articles. Past "articles" have been about finals being canceled, the school being closed, rats infesting the cafeteria, clothing-optional P.E. classes, etc.

The school yearbook is called The Shield.

Connected to Grant High School is a communications/technology magnet which emphasizes smaller class sizes and communications technology electives including film/video production, broadcast journalism, computer technology, graphic communications, and performing arts.

History 
Grant opened as a high school in September 1959. Grant's original purpose was to serve as a high school for the families of World War II veterans who were moving into the San Fernando Valley. Its first students were baby boomers moving into suburban houses in the Valley.

It was in the Los Angeles City High School District until 1961, when it merged into LAUSD.

Reut Cohen of Neon Tommy, a publication of the Annenberg Media Center, wrote that in the 1970s and 1980s the school was "regarded as an excellent public institution."

In the 1990s there was ethnic tension between the Armenian students and the Hispanic and Latino students. An LAUSD official stated a belief that the tension may have originated from earthquake relief drives held in the 1980s which were meant to benefit Armenia and Mexico. Cohen stated that the ethnic tensions were a major factor in the decline of Grant's reputation in the 1990s.

The tensions exploded on October 21, 1999 when a fight between an Armenian girl and a Latina girl turned into a fight among 200 students. The fight resulted in 40 students being detained and minor injuries being inflicted on 10 students, some teachers, and a maintenance worker. No serious injuries occurred. In January 2000 the students signed a "peace treaty" to prevent future fighting. By February banners were erected which promoted peace. By October of that year there were discussion programs aimed at further reducing tension.

A fight involving almost 500 students occurred on March 8, 2005.

In 2006, Grant was relieved of many 9th and 10th graders by the opening of East Valley High School, which planned to phase in grades 11 and 12 in the following two years.

Ethnic tensions reappeared during an Armenian remembrance event in 2008.

Grant was featured in Newsweek magazine's April 17, 2008 cover story about 25 years of divorce in America; Grant was chosen as a prototypical suburban high school and the article featured members of the class of 1982 and their marital stories.

Academic and artistic feats 
In the late 1960s, a local L.A. television station aired a game show called It's Academic, which featured competition among L.A. area high schools in a quiz show format. Grant won the competition both years that the show was on the air.

In 1977, students at Grant achieved a listing in the Guinness Book of World Records for playing the world's largest musical chairs game (record since broken).

Grant students are also credited with helping to paint one of the largest murals in the world—the Great Wall of Los Angeles—in the Tujunga Wash that lies on the border of the campus. The mural, which depicts southwestern U.S. history from prehistoric times, is 2,754 feet (840 m) making it the longest mural in the United States.

Grant's award-winning Academic Decathlon team placed 11th out of 64 schools in the 2009 regional competition.

In 2018 Grant High School had the highest growth of any high school in the Los Angeles Unified School District in SBAC (Smarter Balanced Assessment California) testing, with an increase of 18 points in the English language arts section and 17 points in the math section.

Small Learning Communities

Grant High School will divide their school into multiple smaller learning communities in order to better create an environment of inclusion and additionally serve students with a curriculum that also includes their interest. Teachers will use techniques that have been tested and proven to be successful in academic success.

The freshman academy is designed to help incoming freshman adapt to the High School environment. The freshman academy will continue its focus on Math, Social Science, Science, English, and PE with methods that will help students better prepare freshman for the next years to come. Not only will they focus on academic preparation but it will also focus on social enhancements with hopes of gaining more student involvement in extra curricular activities.

Sophomore Academy/(Has yet to be determined)

Upper Grade Academies/(Has yet to be determined)

Magnet Programs
College Prep of Digital Arts Magnet at Grant High School is a magnet program within Grant High School that focuses on enhancing college level skills. The program's center of interest is on Advancement placement and Honor level proficiency. Due to our global society that is in a state rapid growth the program prepares the students for future workplaces that will be in high demand. In order to strengthen their skills they include web-based research, visual rhetoric, video production, broadcast journalism, and digital imaging into their curriculum.

Since the year 1990 Humanities has been a small academy at Grant High School. The purpose of this academy was to build a sensed community and to challenge students academically. In August 2018, Humanitas was newly established as the "Humanities Magnet for Interdisciplinary Studies. The program would remain consistent of its original mission but with new enhancements. Students enrolled in this program will have access to Los Angeles Valley Community College, college courses, that are specifically open to the students in this program. The classes will count towards High School and College classes. In addition, Humanitas students have the ability to go on field trips and participate in school activities that are only accessible to them.

Demographics

In the mid-20th century the school, as a part of the 'Fourth Jewish Ghetto' in Los Angeles, was composed primarily of Jewish students, perhaps as many as 80% of the student body and a similar proportion of the teachers.  The tracking program in use revealed that at least 90% of the student body attended college, from local community colleges to Ivies, the majority being awarded scholarships and competitive financial support. At the time, Grant was ranked No. 3 among LA high schools, following Pacific Palisades and University High Schools. Deborah Dash Moore, the author of To the Golden Cities: Pursuing the American Jewish Dream in Miami and L.A., wrote that this made the presence of these Jewish students "more visible than numbers alone would warrant." Grant offered Modern Hebrew classes.

In 1978 the school had over 3,000 students. In 1999 the school had 3,400 students, and there were 3,300 students in 2000. That year the student body was 51% Hispanic and Latino, 36% White, 6% African-American, 4% Asian, and 2% Filipino. Most of the Hispanic and Latino students were Mexican American and many of the Whites were Armenian American. As of 2000 the students originated from 48 countries. As of 2010 65% of the students were Hispanic and Latino, and 20% were Armenian.

The Hispanic and Latino students, as of 2015, often originated from families who migrated from Mexico and Central America and were born in the United States; they prefer to identify by their countries of origin even though they are grouped together as Hispanic and Latino. The Armenian students, as of 2015, originated in a wave of immigration from Armenia and the former Soviet Union that began in the early 1990s.

Culture
In 2000 the socialization point for the Latinos was the south side of the school's quad, while the Armenians socialized in the north side. As of that year, fights between Armenian and Latino students often occurred in October. As of 2000 the common belief at the school was that Latinos wore baggy clothes while Armenians dressed more conservatively.

Film program 
Grant has a film program for students either considering a career in that field or with a general interest. Students that have completed his program have earned numerous awards such as certificates, CINE Golden Eagles, trophies and other means of recognition. The students are allowed to freely create stories of their own.

Los Angeles city athletic championships 
1964 Boys Swimming
1965 Boys Swimming
1974 Boys Tennis
1975 Boys Pole Vault (Howard Kwasman)
1986 Boys Baseball
1991 Boys Golf
1992 Boys Golf
1993 Girls Soccer
1994 Girls Soccer
1996 Girls Gymnastics
2012 Boys Pole Vault (Martin Lopez)
Retired numbers: #13 Rod Beck (Baseball), #21 Nevil Vega (Baseball), #25 Gilbert Arenas (Boys Basketball)

Renovations

Due to Grant High School being built in 1959 much of its buildings are outdated. LAUSD has conducted a project proposal that would modernize the school and create space for more students as a result of Los Angeles' rapid growing suburbia. The new plan would start by creating a structure that would better accommodate to students with disabilities under the ADA act. (Americans with disabilities) 41 of Grant's classrooms will be demolished and 31 classes would be rebuilt. 48 classes will be remodeled and 14 of them would remain the same. The library and M&O (maintenance and operations) building will be newly rebuilt. The entire 100 building will be torn down in order to create a newly renovated; career center, health unit, administrative building, and an office for the school police. The sewers, water, utilities will be upgraded in order to create a more sanitary environment. In addition, Grant Hall (Auditorium) will be modernized and the school's landscape will be upgraded.

Notable alumni 

Davie Allan, instrumental rock guitarist
Gilbert Arenas, professional basketball player, NBA All-Star with Washington Wizards
Rod Beck, Major League Baseball pitcher 1991-2003, 3-time All-Star
David Bender, author, radio broadcaster
Barry Carl, former Rockapella band member
Mike Curb, Lt. Governor of California from 1979-1983, music producer
Bobby Diamond, 1964, child actor and later Los Angeles lawyer
Micky Dolenz, actor, musician and drummer of The Monkees
John Dolmayan, rock drummer (System Of A Down)
Moosie Drier, actor and occasional director
Kevin Dubrow, lead singer, co-founder of the rock group Quiet Riot (d. 2007)
Ike Eisenmann, actor, producer, sound effects specialist
Ruthann Friedman, folk musician
Lonn Friend, vice president of A & R for Arista Records
Mitch Gaylord, 1984 Olympic gold medal-winning gymnast
Jim Gordon, popular session drummer
Jeff Green, former editor-in-chief of Games for Windows: The Official Magazine
Tom Griffin, Major League Baseball player, 1969–82
Joel Grover - Los Angeles Television News Investigative Reporter
Melora Hardin, actress, Jan in The Office
Cheryl Holdridge, actress, married to Lance Reventlow
Craig Hundley, musician and former child actor, now known as Craig Huxley
Dan Kalb, City Councilmember, Oakland, CA
Gary Knell, National Geographic Society President and Chief Executive Officer
Michael Landau, session guitarist
Stan Lee (musician) Sobol, guitarist for band The Dickies, formed in 1977, Clown Princes of Punk
Minnette Gersh Lenier, teacher of literacy and professional magician
Kay Lenz, Emmy Award-winning actress, first wife of David Cassidy
Barry Livingston, actor (including Ernie on My Three Sons)
Steve Lukather, musician, member of the rock group Toto
Larry Magid, technology journalist
Bruce Manson, former professional tennis player
Megan Marshack, journalist
Barry "The Fish" Melton, guitarist and co-founder of the band Country Joe and the Fish
Johnette Napolitano, musician, Concrete Blonde
Jessie Nelson, filmmaker (Corinna, Corinna, I Am Sam, The Story of Us, Fred Claus)
Paul Neubauer, violist of New York Philharmonic and instructor at Juilliard and Mannes College of Music
Danny Nucci, actor
David Paich, keyboardist, singer, composer and co-founder of the rock group Toto
Fran Pavley, California State Senator
Jeff Porcaro, drummer, co-founder of the rock group Toto (d. 1992)
Mike Porcaro, member of rock group Toto
Steve Porcaro, musician, composer, co-founder of rock group Toto
Mike Post, composer of music and theme songs for popular TV series
Marcia Reed, movie stills photographer
Brian Robbins, actor in Head of the Class, director of Norbit"
Tom Scott, musician, writer of themes to "Starsky & Hutch", "The Streets of San Francisco", and "Family Ties".
Tom Selleck, actor
Robert Shields, mime, dance and comedy with Shields and Yarnell
Michael Simpson, Grammy Award-winning record producer and composer, one of the "Dust Brothers"
Jim Umbarger, Major League Baseball player 1975-78
Kim Ung-Yong 
Joseph Williams, film/TV composer and lead singer in rock group Toto
Linda Wolf, photographer

Use as a filming location 
Grant High School has been featured in a number of film and television productions. This is due to the long strip of road (known as "Lancer Lane") that runs between the eastern boundary of the school and a scenic greenbelt, walking path, and the Tujunga Wash, and the availability of ample parking—combined with the ease of moving equipment around. Grant High School is also recognized as among the best high schools in the country for its film/video productions made by students of the communications/technology magnet.

Among the professional film and television productions that have utilized Grant High School as a filming location:
American Vandal - Primary location
Dope (2015 film)
Balls of Fury - Auditorium and Campus
Black-ish
Clueless - the film and exterior shots and the television series
Crazy, Stupid, Love
CSI: Miami
Euphoria
Foursome - YouTube Red series
Ferris Bueller
Freaks and Geeks
Ghost Whisperer
He's All That - Film on Netflix (2021)
Life Goes On
Malcolm in the Middle
Mighty Morphin Power Rangers
Mini's First Time - Lifetime Original Movie
My Name Is Earl - TV Show on NBC
Not Another Teen Movie
Power Rangers in Space
Power Rangers Turbo
Power Rangers Zeo
Project UFO - NBC TV Show (1978–1979)
Quincy, M.E. - NBC TV Show (1976–1983)
Reba
Saved By the Bell - exterior shot
Seduced By Madness: The Diane Borchardt Story
Six Feet Under - Cable show (interior shots of class rooms)
Teen Wolf (TV Series) - TV Show (Season 3-Season 6)
The 70's House - MTV Reality Show (Dodgeball scene)
The Hollow - Movie based on the Legend of Sleepy Hollow
The Office
The Secret Life of the American Teenager - ABC Family TV Series
The United States of Tara - Showtime Series
True Blood - HBO Series
What Really Happened to the Class of '65? - TV Series
Where the Action Is - ABC TV Show (1965–1967)
Who's Your Daddy? - a direct-to-video feature film
With Six You Get Eggroll - 1968 movie starring Doris Day and Brian Keith
You Again
Yours, Mine and Ours
It's Always Sunny In Philadelphia (The Football Field)

Many music videos including:
Deftones - "Back to School" (interior and exterior shots)
Escape The Fate - "Situations"
Hellogoodbye - "Baby It's Fact"
N.E.R.D - "Rockstar"
Three Doors Down - "Loser" (hallways, teachers lounge, class rooms, and exterior shots)
P Diddy - "It's All About the Benjamins" (used gym)
Tantric - "Breakdown"
The Offspring - "Kristy, Are you doing Okay?"
Iggy Azalea - "Fancy"
 Wheatus - “Teenage Dirtbag”

References

External links 
 
 Grant Communications Technology Magnet
 Internet Movie Database: Titles with locations including Grant High School, Valley Glen, California, USA

Educational institutions established in 1959

High schools in Los Angeles
High schools in the San Fernando Valley
Los Angeles Unified School District schools
Public high schools in California
Valley Glen, Los Angeles
1959 establishments in California